Astrocaryum ferrugineum (syn. Astrocaryum murumuru Wallace var. ferrugineum (F.Kahn & B.Millán) A.J.Hend.) is a palm native to Amazon Rainforest in Brazil.

References

ferrugineum
Trees of Brazil